Pseudojana perspicuifascia is a species of moth of the family Eupterotidae first described by Rothschild in 1917. It is found in Sundaland and on Nias.

The ground colour of the wings is dark red to purplish red. The forewings marked with a series of transverse, more or less straight fasciae.

Subspecies
Pseudojana perspicuifascia perspicuifascia
Pseudojana perspicuifascia niassana Rothschild, 1917 (Nias)

References

Eupterotinae
Moths described in 1917